The City of Chihuahua, Chihuahua, Mexico is divided mainly into areas called Colonias, which incorporate residential and commercial elements.

Small general stores called abarrotes, which are 'Mom-and-Pop' operations, may be found in most neighbourhoods, along with other small businesses.  Industry, which was once found in the colonias as well, is now moving to the industrial parks in the city.
   
The list of colonias in Chihuahua City:
Josefa Ortiz de Dominguez
Independencia
Aeropuerto
Alamedas
Bellavista
Cafetales
Campanario
Campesina
Campobello
Centro
Chihuahua 2000
Club Campestre
Cumbres
Diego Lucero
Granjas
Guadalupe
Industrial
Lomas del Santuario
Marmol
Martin Lopez
Mirador
Nombre de Dios
Pacifico
Panamericana
Paseos de Chihuahua
Ponce de Leon
Pinos
Quintas Carolinas
Quintas del Sol
Rosario
San Felipe Viejo
San Felipe y Parques de San Felipe
San Francisco
San Jose Y Ampliación
San Miguel
San Rafael
Santa Rita
Santa Rosa
Santo Niño
Tecnológico
Tierra y Libertad
Villa
Zootecnia

This list is in alphabetical order. It does not include the new subdivisions, gated communities or fraccionamientos that are now a part of the landscape of the city.

Geography of Chihuahua (state)
Chihuahua City